Coleophora cercidiphyllella is a moth of the family Coleophoridae. It is found on the Japanese islands of Hokkaido and Honshu.

The wingspan is 9.5–11 mm.

The larvae feed on Cercidiphyllum japonicum. They create a light greyish-brown, tubular leaf-case, gradually tapering towards the anal end. It is 5–6 mm in length with a large blackish dorsal patch, which is transversely sculptured. They feed on the young leaves and can be found in May.

References

cercidiphyllella
Moths described in 1965
Moths of Japan